Oh Sun-jin (Hangul: 오선진) (born July 7, 1989, in Seoul) is a South Korean pitcher for the Samsung Lions in the Korea Baseball Organization (KBO).

References 

Samsung Lions players
Hanwha Eagles players
KBO League infielders
South Korean baseball players
1989 births
Living people